Fanni Tellis Creek is a stream in the U.S. state of Ohio.

The creek's name, also spelled "Fannie Tullis", honors a local citizen.

References

Rivers of Warren County, Ohio
Rivers of Ohio